Vladimir Viktorovich Niederhaus (born 13 August 1967) is a Kazakhstani football official and a former player. He played international football for both Kazakhstan and Russia.

Post-playing career
After retirement, Niederhaus held various administrative positions is his former club Rotor Volgograd and several Kazakh clubs. Between 2012 and 2015 he worked as national teams dept director in Football Federation of Kazakhstan.

Match fixing scandal
On 19 September 2008, Shakhter Karagandy and FC Vostok were disqualified from the Kazakhstan Premier League for playing a fixed match, club coaches and management involved were banned from football for 60 months, including Niederhaus.

References

External links
 

1967 births
Living people
Sportspeople from Kokshetau
Russian and Soviet-German people
Kazakhstani footballers
Russian footballers
Soviet footballers
Kazakhstan international footballers
Kazakhstani expatriate footballers
Russia international footballers
FC Kairat players
FC Zhenis Astana players
FC Rotor Volgograd players
Russian Premier League players
Kazakhstan Premier League players
Maccabi Haifa F.C. players
Expatriate footballers in Israel
Maccabi Herzliya F.C. players
SC Preußen Münster players
Dual internationalists (football)
Kazakhstani people of German descent
People from Kokshetau
Association football forwards